Walter Hempel (February 15, 1876 – June 17, 1949) was an American football, baseball and track and field coach.
He served as the head football coach at Pomona College in 1903 and at St. Vincent's College in Los Angeles, California from 1907 to 1908.  Hempel later worked in real estate in Lake Tahoe, California.  He was killed there on June 17, 1949 in an apparent robbery-murder.

References

1876 births
1949 deaths
American real estate businesspeople
German emigrants to the United States
Loyola Marymount Lions athletic directors
Loyola Lions football coaches
North Dakota Fighting Hawks baseball coaches
North Dakota Fighting Hawks athletic directors
Northwestern Wildcats track and field coaches
Pomona-Pitzer Sagehens football coaches
Knox Prairie Fire track and field coaches
High school football coaches in California
Sportspeople from Dresden
Deaths by firearm in California
People murdered in California